Kim Seok-bae is a South Korean Taekwondo practitioner. He was the Asian taekwondo champion in 2016 on the under 63 kg (bantamweight) category.

References 

1992 births
Living people
South Korean male taekwondo practitioners
Asian Taekwondo Championships medalists
21st-century South Korean people